Hydrazinium azide or hydrazine azide is a chemical compound with formula  or .  It is a salt of the hydrazinium cation  and the azide anion .  It can be seen as a derivative of hydrazine  and hydrazoic acid .  It is an unstable solid.

The compound is of scientific interest because of its high nitrogen content (93% nitrogen by weight) and explosive properties.

Structure

The solid undergoes structural phase transition to a different crystalline arrangement at a pressure of 13 GPa.

Chemistry

Hydrazinium azide decomposes explosively into hydrazine, ammonia, and nitrogen gas:

12  → 3  + 16  + 19 

This compound is less hygroscopic and less volatile than pure hydrazinium azide. It decomposes explosively into nitrogen, hydrogen, and ammonia.

At pressure of 40 GPa, hydrazinium azide decomposes yielding a linear nitrogen allotrope  or N≡−−N=N−−≡N, that decomposes to ε-N2 below 25 GPa.

Reaction of hydrazinium azide with sulfuric acid gives quantitative yields of pure hydrazinediium sulfate and hydrazoic acid:
[][] + H2SO4  →  [][] + HN3

See also

 Ammonium azide,

References

Azides
Hydrazinium compounds